Malthonea guttata is a species of beetle in the family Cerambycidae. It was described by Theodor Franz Wilhelm Kirsch in 1888. It is known from Colombia and Ecuador.

References

Desmiphorini
Beetles described in 1888